Raffaelo Caserta (born 15 August 1972) is an Italian fencer. He won a bronze medal in the team sabre event at the 1996 Summer Olympics in Atlanta.

References

External links
 

1972 births
Living people
Italian male fencers
Olympic fencers of Italy
Fencers at the 1996 Summer Olympics
Fencers at the 2000 Summer Olympics
Olympic bronze medalists for Italy
Olympic medalists in fencing
Fencers from Naples
Medalists at the 1996 Summer Olympics